Gaetano Tosto (born 18 April 1948) is an Italian weightlifter. He competed at the 1972 Summer Olympics and the 1980 Summer Olympics.

References

1948 births
Living people
Italian male weightlifters
Olympic weightlifters of Italy
Weightlifters at the 1972 Summer Olympics
Weightlifters at the 1980 Summer Olympics
Sportspeople from Catania
20th-century Italian people
21st-century Italian people